The Municipality of Škofja Loka is a municipality in the Upper Carniola region of Slovenia. The seat of the municipality is the town of Škofja Loka. The municipality was established in its current form on 3 October 1994, when the former larger Municipality of Škofja Loka was subdivided into the municipalities of Gorenja Vas–Poljane, Škofja Loka, Železniki, and Žiri.

Settlements
In addition to the municipal seat of Škofja Loka, the municipality also includes the following settlements:

 Binkelj
 Bodovlje
 Breznica pod Lubnikom
 Brode
 Bukov Vrh nad Visokim
 Bukovica
 Bukovščica
 Crngrob
 Dorfarje
 Draga
 Forme
 Gabrk
 Gabrovo
 Gabrška Gora
 Godešič
 Gorenja Vas–Reteče
 Gosteče
 Grenc
 Hosta
 Knape
 Kovski Vrh
 Križna Gora
 Lipica
 Log nad Škofjo Loko
 Moškrin
 Na Logu
 Papirnica
 Pevno
 Podpulfrca
 Pozirno
 Praprotno
 Pungert
 Puštal
 Reteče
 Rovte v Selški Dolini
 Ševlje
 Sopotnica
 Spodnja Luša
 Staniše
 Stara Loka
 Stirpnik
 Strmica
 Suha
 Svetega Petra Hrib
 Sveti Andrej
 Sveta Barbara
 Sveti Duh
 Sveti Florijan nad Škofjo Loko
 Sveti Lenart
 Sveti Ožbolt
 Sveti Tomaž
 Trata
 Trnje
 Valterski Vrh
 Vešter
 Vincarje
 Virlog
 Virmaše
 Visoko pri Poljanah
 Zgornja Luša
 Zminec

References

External links

Municipality of Škofja Loka on Geopedia
Škofja Loka municipal site

 
1994 establishments in Slovenia
Skofja Loka